Pogonogenys proximalis is a moth in the family Crambidae. It was described by Charles H. Fernald in 1894. It is found in North America, where it has been recorded from California and Nevada.

References

Moths described in 1894
Odontiini